Kustaa Killinen (7 September 1849, Isokyrö – 5 January 1922) was a Finnish schoolteacher, writer and politician. He belonged to the Young Finnish Party. Killinen served as a Member of the Diet of Finland from 1897 to 1906 and as a Member of the Parliament of Finland from 1913 to 1916.

References

1849 births
1922 deaths
People from Isokyrö
People from Vaasa Province (Grand Duchy of Finland)
Young Finnish Party politicians
Members of the Diet of Finland
Members of the Parliament of Finland (1913–16)